Branxton is a village and civil parish in northern Northumberland, England. At the 2011 Census, the population of the parish was 123, increasing slightly from 121 at the 2001 Census.

Landmarks 
Branxton is very close to the site of the Battle of Flodden, fought on 9 September 1513 between Scotland and England, the latter prevailing. A granite cross on the nearby Piper Hill (UK map reference NT890373) commemorates the battle. In 2013, the local community commemorated the 500 year anniversary of the battle. 

Pallinsburn House, an 18th-century country mansion, stands nearby.

There is a painted concrete menagerie in the garden of one of the houses in the village. The sculptures were made, starting in 1962, by James Beveridge to designs by retired joiner John Fairnington (d. 1981) to amuse his disabled son, Edwin. As well as animals, there are statues of Winston Churchill, T. E. Lawrence and Robert Burns, and many texts set into the plinths and pathways. It has been a popular tourist attraction, with its own tea room, and may still be accessible by the public for free (although with a coin box for voluntary donations).

Religious sites 
The parish church, dedicated to Saint Paul, occupies the site of an ancient church which was taken down and replaced by the present structure in 1849.

Notable people 
Percival Stockdale, (1736–1811) poet, writer and reformer, especially in opposing slavery.

References

External links

 GENUKI (Accessed: 19 November 2008)

Villages in Northumberland